Chrostosoma endochrysa is a moth of the subfamily Arctiinae. it was described by Paul Dognin in 1911. It is found in French Guiana.

References

Chrostosoma
Moths described in 1911